Ladislavia taczanowskii, the Taczanowski's gudgeon, is a species of cyprinid fish found in the Yalu and Amur drainages in Eastern Asia. It is the only member of its genus and was named after the Polish zoologist Władysław Taczanowski.

References

 

Cyprinid fish of Asia
Freshwater fish of China
Fish of Russia
Fish described in 1839